Linda Louise Bierds (born 1945 in Delaware) is an American poet and professor of English and creative writing at the University of Washington, where she also received her B.A. in 1969.

Her books include Flights of the Harvest Mare; The Stillness, the Dancing; Heart and Perimeter; and The Ghost Trio (Henry Holt 1994). 
Since 1984, her work has appeared regularly in The New Yorker.  Her poems are featured in American Alphabets: 25 Contemporary Poets (2006) and many other anthologies.  She lives on Bainbridge Island.

Awards
She has received fellowships from the National Endowment for the Arts in 1988, the Ingram Merrill Foundation, Artist Trust and the Guggenheim Memorial Foundation in 1995. 
In 1998, she was awarded a John D. and Catherine T. MacArthur Fellowship "genius" grant. She received an honorary degree in Doctor of Letters from Oglethorpe University in 2011.

Bibliography

Collections
Beasts : Three Short Stories University of Washington, 1971
Snaring the flightless birds : the legends of Maui Allegany Mountain Press, 1982, 
Off the Aleutian chain : poetry, L'Epervier Press, 1985, 
Flights of the harvest-mare, Ahsahta Press, 1985, 
The stillness, the dancing : poems, H. Holt, 1988, 
Heart and perimeter : poems H. Holt, 1991, 
The ghost trio : poems H. Holt, 1994, 
The profile makers : poems Henry Holt, 1997, 
The seconds : poems G.P. Putnam's Sons, 2001, 
There : Suzzallo Library, University of Washington, November 2002 (2002)
First Hand: Poems, Penguin Group, 2005, 
Flight: New and Selected Poems Penguin, 2008
Roget's Illusion : poems G. P. Putnams's Sons, 2014
The Hardy Tree : poems Copper Canyon Press, 2019

List of poems

References

External links
"Lyric and Narrative", The Atlantic, Sarah Cohen
"On Linda Bierds" Octopus Magazine, Jeff Encke

1945 births
American academics of English literature
American women non-fiction writers
American women poets
The Atlantic (magazine) people
Living people
MacArthur Fellows
Poets from Delaware
University of Washington alumni
University of Washington faculty
American women academics
21st-century American women